Robert A. Hefner Jr. (June 2, 1907 – May 18, 1987) was inducted into the Oklahoma Hall of Fame in 1973.

Early childhood 
Robert A. Hefner Jr. was born on June 2, 1907 to Eva and Robert A. Hefner in Beaumont, Texas. In November 1907, the Hefner family decided to move to Ardmore, Oklahoma, where Junior would spend the majority of his childhood. He was a competitor in all of his endeavors. He studied the violin from age 5 with noted Ardmore teacher Sol Lowenstein and won the gold medal for the State of Oklahoma. It was because of his passion for the violin that he decided to take up a more manly endeavor - boxing. Hefner joked, "Any boy who plays the violin has to learn to protect himself." Hefner Jr. consistently stayed in the top 5% of his class scholastically.

Robert Hefner, Jr. was a Regimental Featherweight Boxing Champion, set a course record for golf, won the Gold Medal for the State of Oklahoma while playing the violin, and played in both the Stanford University Chapel Orchestra and the San Francisco Symphony all before the age of 21.

Boy Scouts of America 
In 1918, at 11 years old, Hefner became an active participant in the Boy Scouts of America. From the end of 1918 through the first of 1920, Bob had claimed the title of Life Scout, the highest merit offered to any scout by the Ardmore Council at that time. In the summer of 1920, it was announced in the Daily Ardmoreite that Bob and James Dolman would attend the first International Jubilee in London, England. The USS Pocahantas, a warship furnished free of cost by the United States government to take them across to England, set sail July 6, 1920. Bob, the "youngest and smallest" American scout, won a gold medal for his weight class in boxing and was presented a gold medal by the King of England himself. Hefner would eventually go on to attain his Eagle Scout ranking.

The Culver years 
Influenced by Brigadier General L. R. Gignilliat, a man he met while in at the Jubilee in England, Bob told his parents of his desire to attend Culver Military Academies in Indiana, and did so in 1922. While at Culver, every Sunday evening, Bob wrote his parents in Ardmore a letter. Bob immediately joined Culver's famed Black Horse Troop, which had been formed in 1906 and rode in the inaugural parade in Washington, DC in 1912 as the personal escort of the Vice President Thomas R. Marshall because of its reputation. For his "aptitude in military instruction" he was awarded the Cross Sabres and the Silver Lozenge, honors given for excellence.

His second year, 1922–1923, Bob earned his letter in basketball, track, ice hockey, and boxing, winning the title of champion in boxing Featherweight category for the 2nd division. Bob also ended up serving as a corporal in the Black Horse Troop, the highest rank he could attain as a second year student. During this year, Bob entered the Amateur Athletic Union (AAU) Tournament (later called the Golden Gloves) to reach the championship finals in his weight class in the three-state area.

College years 
In 1924, Hefner decided to attend Stanford University.  He kept up his passions for golf, boxing, and the violin through his life. While at Stanford, his sparring partner was Fidel Labarba, a Cuban who went on to an undefeated professional career as a featherweight. Hefner pledged Delta Upsilon in 1925 while at Stanford and played the violin in the San Francisco Symphony.

However, when Hefner returned home for the summer of 1926, he learned of his father's bid for justice of the Oklahoma Supreme Court for the Fifth Judicial District. Very quickly, all of the Judge's family members became involved in the political race. When September came and it was time to go back to California, Hefner instead enrolled at the University of Oklahoma in order to stay home and support his father.

The next year, Hefner returned to Stanford for what would be his first year of law school while it was also his last year of undergraduate study. At that time students normally were admitted to law school after only two years of undergraduate work, then did three years of law study to graduate with a bachelor of laws degree. In the fall of 1927, he received his undergraduate degree summa cum laude from Stanford University.

Law degree 
A graduate of Stanford University, Hefner also studied at Harvard Law School (1928-1929) and took his law degree from University of Oklahoma College of Law in 1930. In his first year at Harvard Law, Bob was selected to the Harvard Law Review, an honor almost unheard of for a second-year student who had not taken his first years work at Harvard. Then, in the fall of 1929, Bob decided to complete his degree at the University of Oklahoma's Law School. He finished at the top of his class and finished fourth in what would be the first graduating law class from the University of Oklahoma that was required to take the State Bar Exam in June 1930.

Politics and legal career 
Upon graduation, his father told Bob he would pay for him and one person of his choice to travel the world as part of his last piece of education and Bob chose his sister Evelyn. They traveled West around the world starting with Hawaii. On their way to Hawaii, they made good friends with another couple on the boat: Nelson Rockefeller and his bride traveling on their honeymoon. They then traveled to Kobe, Tokyo, Shanghai, Hong Kong, Manila, Singapore, Java, Surabaja, Burma, Rangoon, Calcutta, Darjeeling, Agra, Port Said, Cairo, and Marseille before returning home through New York.

Fresh off his trip from around the world, Bob formed a partnership with Chief Justice of the Oklahoma Supreme Court Charles W. Mason to begin his law practice on the 12th floor of the Petroleum Building in Oklahoma City. His first case, brought to him intentionally by his father, was an Indian case of half-bloods that he lost. As Bob recounted, "Now I know why you [Sr.] didn't go over there".

In 1933, Bob severed the partnership with the Chief Justice to become assistant to Stanley Forman Reed, the General Counsel for the Reconstruction Finance Corporation. In Washington, Bob quickly was introduced to society by Pearl Mesta and ended up running into an old friend, Elliott Roosevelt. Bob had met Elliott Roosevelt at a brunch he was hosting while in Dallas, Texas, a few years before and introduced him to Ruth Josephine Googins, whom Roosevelt married on July 22, 1933. Following this, Bob became great friends with the Roosevelts and frequented the White House for dinners, often providing energy policy advice to President Roosevelt.

On the evening of March 27, 1935, while at dinner in the White House with the Roosevelts, Louise Currie, whom Bob married on June 26, 1934, went into labor. Ice and snow prevented travel to the hospital. The secret service barely cleared the way with snowplows - otherwise Robert Hefner III would have been born in the Oval Office.

Less than 3 months later, Bob decided it was time to move on from politics. He moved to the Tri-State Oil Field (the area where Illinois, Indiana, and Kentucky adjoin) to begin his oil & gas law practice. He took all three states' bar examinations, passed them with top grades, and quickly made a name for himself in the area. Sun Oil Company (now Sunoco), Sinclair Prairie Oil Company (now Sinclair Oil Corporation), Phillips Petroleum (which survived a Carl Icahn-led hostile takeover, now ConocoPhillips), Deep Rock Oil Corporation (Kerr-McGee -> Anadarko Petroleum ->, now Occidental Petroleum), Trans-Western Oil Company, Frontier Fuel Oil Corporation and Kingwood Oil Company were among his clientele during his time in Evansville, Indiana.

His contributions to the legal community are remembered at the Conoco Oil Pioneers of Oklahoma Plaza at the Sam Noble Museum at the University of Oklahoma, which reads "Moving to Illinois in 1936, he became one of the most successful and sought after petroleum attorneys in the country."

Marriage to Helen Jane Phillips & the donation of the Philmont Ranch to the Boy Scouts of America 
Bob then married Waite Phillips' daughter, Helen Jane, on July 16, 1940. The two had dated years before and grew up together in Ardmore. For their wedding gift, Mr. Phillips gave Robert the deeds to the Philmont Ranch, a  ranch in New Mexico, along with Philcade and Philtower, the two most notable business buildings in Tulsa. Unfortunately, they soon realized they had been correct years before in not giving into their family's wishes of marrying. On August 27, 1941 Bob and Helen filed for divorce. Bob even went back to Mr. Phillips and offered the wedding gifts back to him, an offer that he refused. So, they both agreed that Bob would donate the properties to the Boy Scouts of America, the largest single donation in the history of Scouting.

He married Elinor Hope Hartmetz in Evansville on March 16, 1945. Because of wartime travel restrictions, their honeymoon was in St. Louis. He remained with Elinor the remainder of his life.

The Hefner Company 
In 1946, he returned to Oklahoma at his father’s request and assumed management of Hefner Production Company, becoming the managing partner of the Hefner Company. A leading independent oil producer, Robert Hefner, Jr. was a major figure in the Independent Petroleum Association of America and the Oklahoma Independent Petroleum Association. He was an Energy Center Founder at the University of Oklahoma.

Donation of the Hefner Mansion 
Widely known for his philanthropic activities, he was instrumental in the donation of the Hefner Mansion to the Oklahoma Heritage Association.

Death 
Hefner died in Oklahoma City on May 18, 1987.

References

Further reading 
Faulk, Odie B. and Laura E. An Oklahoma Legacy: The Life of Robert A. Hefner, Jr. Oklahoma City: Oklahoma Heritage Association, 1988.
Trafzer, Clifford Earl. The Judge: The Life of Robert A. Hefner. Norman: University of Oklahoma Press, 1975.
Singer, Mark. Funny Money. New York: Alfred A. Knopf, Inc., 1985.

1907 births
1987 deaths
People from Beaumont, Texas
People from Ardmore, Oklahoma
Oklahoma lawyers
20th-century American lawyers